Prostitution in Mexico is legal under Federal Law. Each of the 31 states enacts its own prostitution laws and policies. Thirteen of the states of Mexico allow and regulate prostitution. Prostitution involving minors under 18 is illegal. Some Mexican cities have enacted "tolerance zones" ("zonas de tolerancia") which allow regulated prostitution and function as red-light districts. In Tuxtla Gutiérrez, capital of the state of Chiapas, there is a state-run brothel at the Zona Galáctica(Galactic Zone). In most parts of the country, pimping is illegal, although pimp-worker relationships still occur, sometimes under female pimps called "madrotas"("Big Mothers"). The government provides shelter for former prostitutes.

UNAIDS estimated the number of prostitutes in the country at 236,930 in 2016.

History
Prostitution was known to exist during the Aztec Empire although the details are relatively unknown, as much Aztec history was chronicled later by Roman Catholics in a pejorative manner based on strict European values and law.

Following the Spanish conquest and establishment of New Spain, Spanish settlers created a demand for prostitution. Throughout the 16th and 17th centuries prostitution was tolerated provided it was kept out of sight. Although Philip IV banned the practice, this was generally unenforced. 

Prostitution was first regulated in Mexico during the French occupation in the 1860s. These regulations which consisted of registering oneself as a prostitute and of regular health care check-ups were implemented to protect European soldiers from contracting sexually transmitted diseases, since sexually transmitted diseases particularly syphilis and gonorrhea were spreading quickly. While in power, the French influenced the perception of sex work in various ways, as they categorized women based on their views of beauty and classified places where sex work was done depending on location and services available. Though the French enforced supervision of prostitutes as a way of protecting themselves from infections, similar regulations remained when Mexico regained control of the country.

During the authoritarian regime of Porfirio Díaz in the late 19th century, regulations in the forms of monthly quotas, medical examinations, and photographic documentation were imposed upon prostitutes. Regulatory practices were most severe on the eve of the Mexican export-mining economic collapse, and had been met with backlash from women's rights groups in Oaxaca, Yucatán, and Veracruz. According to a 1908 study, economic concerns were the main reason for turning to the sex trade in the Porfiriato, at which time 15 to 30 per cent of Mexico City's young female population was employed in the sex trade. 

During the Mexican Revolution, supplies to the cities were severely disrupted, and many women prostituted themselves for food in the period 1913–1915. In the post-war period of reconstruction and consolidation during the 1920s and 1930s, many impoverished women in the cities turned to prostitution. The revolutionary political and social reforms under Lázaro Cárdenas led to the end of the regulation of prostitution in 1940.

Although morally pressured by the United States and the prevalent changes ongoing prostitution after World War I, El Paso's location served as a convenient place for prostitution to thrive. El Paso's proximity to the United States border allowed for quick and easy access by Americans after the abolition of prostitution. The access to Mexico via the railroad from the United States and the economic success of prostitution gave way to a surge of Mexican women participating in this kind of labor. As prostitution increased, so did the regulations.

In translocal border cities such as Mexicali in Baja California, local brothels and vaudeville theaters became spaces for American tourists, Asian laborers, and Mexican-American sex workers to intermingle in the 1930s. In the mid-2000s, American men make up a significant clientele sector for sex workers in border cities, specifically Ciudad Juárez and Tijuana—more than two-thirds of female sex workers in these two cities had had at least one male U.S. client in the prior two months.

It has been argued that neoliberal reforms instituted in the 1990s under the PRI administration of Carlos Salinas de Gortari—including the signing of NAFTA in 1994—incubated adverse economic conditions that caused the migration of indigenous women from southern Mexico to northern border locales to find work in the sex trade or in maquiladoras.  Violence against sex workers in Ciudad Juárez has been connected to similar atrocities committed against maquiladora workers.

Child prostitution

Child prostitution is a problem in the country, and Mexico continues to be a destination for pedophiles who engage in child sex tourism. Mexico has one of the highest levels of child sexual exploitation, along with Thailand, Cambodia, Colombia, India, and Brazil.

A study by UNICEF Mexico and the DIF/National System for Integral Family Development estimated that more than 16,000 children in Mexico were involved in prostitution in June 2000. A 2004 study by researcher Elena Azaola estimated that some 17,000 children under the age of 18 are victims of the sex trade in Mexico; the State System of Integral Family Development (DIF) reported that more than 20,000 minors were victims of child prostitution in Mexico in 2005, an increase since the year 2000.

Out of Mexico City's 13,000 street children, 95% have had at least one sexual encounter with an adult (many of them through prostitution). In the impoverished southern state of Chiapas, children have been sold for $100 to $200, according to human rights groups. Chiapas is considered one of the worst places in the world in terms of child prostitution.

Child sex tourism persists in Mexico, especially in tourist areas such as Acapulco, Puerto Vallarta, and Cancún, and in northern border cities such as Tijuana and Ciudad Juárez. Some NGOs alleged that some corrupt local officials allowed commercial sexual exploitation of children to occur. Many child sex tourists are from the United States, Canada, and Western Europe, though some are Mexican citizens. Casa Alianza director Manuel Capellin is quoted as saying "More than 16,000 children are sexually exploited through networks involving foreigners and military, police, government and business officials."

Sex trafficking

Mexico is a source, transit, and destination country for women and children subjected to sex trafficking. Groups considered most vulnerable to human trafficking in Mexico include women, children, indigenous persons, persons with mental and physical disabilities, migrants, and LGBTI individuals. Mexican women and children, and to a lesser extent men and transgender individuals, are exploited in sex trafficking in Mexico and the United States. Transgender Mexicans in commercial sex are vulnerable to sex trafficking. Residents at substance addiction rehabilitation centers and women's shelters have been subjected to sex trafficking.

Young female migrants recounted being robbed, beaten, and raped by members of criminal gangs and then forced to work in table dance bars or as prostitutes under threat of further harm to them or their families. The majority of non-Mexican trafficking victims come from Central America; lesser numbers come from Brazil, Cuba, Ecuador, China, Taiwan, South Korea, India, Uruguay, and Eastern European countries. Victims are also trafficked to the United States.

The United States Department of State Office to Monitor and Combat Trafficking in Persons ranks Mexico as a 'Tier 2' country ("does not fully meet the minimum standards for the elimination of trafficking; however, it is making significant efforts to do so").

See also
Boy's Town, Nuevo Laredo
Prostitution in the Americas
Zona Norte, Tijuana

References

Further reading

External links
Mexico City lawmakers seek to legalize prostitution
A New Law in Tijuana Regulates the Oldest Profession
PROSTITUTES JOIN MEXICO AIDS FIGHT